Ahora is the second studio album released by Mexican singer-songwriter Christian Nodal, released on May 10, 2019. It is his second full-length Mariachi album.

Ahora debuted at number seven on the Billboard Top Latin Albums chart in the United States.

Track listing

Charts

Weekly charts

Year-end charts

Certifications

See also
2019 in Latin music

References

2019 albums
Christian Nodal albums
Spanish-language albums
Universal Music Latino albums
Latin Grammy Award for Best Ranchero/Mariachi Album
Albums produced by Edgar Barrera